Sherman Pass may refer to:
Sherman Pass (California) in the southern Sierra Nevada
Sherman Pass (Washington) in the Kettle River Range
Sherman Pass Scenic Byway, a portion of Washington State Route 20